Coralastele pulcherrima is a species of sea snail, a marine gastropod mollusk, in the family Calliostomatidae within the superfamily Trochoidea, the top snails, turban snails and their allies.

Description
The size of the shell varies between 6 mm and 10 mm.

Distribution
This species occurs in Philippines.

References

Calliostomatidae